Flipkart Video is an India-based OTT (Over the Top) video streaming platform operated by Walmart-owned Flipkart. It was launched in 2019 and has lined up content from partners like Voot, Arre, Viu, TVF, Pocket Aces' Dice Media and more. In October 2019, it announced its first original series Back Benchers, a quiz show hosted by Bollywood film producer and director Farah Khan, which features Bollywood celebrities as students and host Farah as the dean of the figurative school. Bollywood celebrities who appeared on the show are Anil Kapoor, Shilpa Shetty, Kartik Aaryan, Parineeti Chopra, Ananya Pandey, Bhumi Pednekar, Tapsee Pannu, Janhvi Kapoor, Malaika Arora amongst others.

Overview
Flipkart Video is a free video streaming service that is available within the video section of the Flipkart app. Flipkart has tied up with various production houses including Studio Next and Frames and Sikhya Productions to beef up its library of original series in various languages and genres for the Flipkart users.

Flipkart Video Original programming
Flipkart Video Originals features programming in the following genres: action, comedy, romance, drama, horror, adventure and more.

Original series

Original short films

Upcoming projects
 Romanchak Gannah Ka Dhoom

References

External links 

 

Indian entertainment websites
Companies based in Bangalore
2019 establishments in Karnataka
Indian companies established in 2019
Video on demand services
Internet television streaming services
Internet properties established in 2019
Indian film websites